Class 28 may refer to:
 Belgian Railways Class 28 (Baume-Marpent), Belgian electric locomotive introduced in 1950
 Belgian Railways Class 28 (Bombardier), Belgian electric locomotive introduced in 2007
 British Rail Class 28 "Metrovick", British diesel-electric locomotive
 L&YR Class 28, British 0-6-0 steam locomotive